Boncuklu can refer to:

 Boncuklu, Ergani
 Boncuklu Tarla